Anders Frederik Emil Victor Schau Lassen, VC, MC & Two Bars (22 September 1920 – 9 April 1945) was a highly decorated Danish soldier, who was the only non-Commonwealth recipient of the British Victoria Cross in the Second World War. He was posthumously awarded the United Kingdom's highest gallantry award for his actions during Operation Roast on 8 April 1945 at Lake Comacchio in Italy in the final weeks of the Italian campaign.

The Danish officer was ordered to lead a raid that would give the impression that a major landing was being undertaken. Lassen fulfilled his mission in the face of overwhelming enemy numbers by single-handedly taking out three enemy positions before being mortally wounded. As his men's lives would be endangered in the withdrawal, he refused to be evacuated from the area.

Early life and background
Anders Lassen was born on the Høvdingsgård estate near Mern, Vordingborg Municipality,  the son of estate owners Emil Victor Schau Lassen and Suzanne Maria Signe Lassen. Lassen's paternal grandfather  A. F. J. C. Lassen, made his fortune as the owner of a tobacco plantation on Sumatra. In 1917, Lassen's father took over the Høvdingsgård estate. Lassen was a first cousin of Axel von dem Bussche, a German Resistance member who unsuccessfully tried to kill Adolf Hitler in 1943.

Military career

While serving in Denmark's merchant navy, he came to the United Kingdom shortly after the start of the Second World War where he joined the British Commandos in 1940, serving with No. 62 Commando (also known as the Small Scale Raiding Force). The unit was formed around a small group of commandos under the command of the Special Operations Executive (SOE). He was commissioned in the field on the General List and awarded an immediate Military Cross for his part in Operation Postmaster, the capture of three Italian and German ships from the neutral Spanish colonial island of Fernando Po, now known as Bioko, in the Gulf of Guinea.

In early 1943, No. 62 Commando was disbanded, and its members were dispersed amongst other formations. Lassen was among a number who went to the Middle East to serve in the Special Boat Section, then attached to the Special Air Service. Others joined the 2nd SAS under the command of Bill Stirling (1911-1983), elder brother of David Stirling. During his time in the SBS, Lassen rose in rank to become a Major by October 1944. During his service he fought in North-West Europe, North Africa, Crete, the Aegean islands, mainland Greece, Yugoslavia and Italy. He was awarded two further bars to his Military Cross on 27 September 1943 and 15 February 1944.

On 24 April 1944, he led a successful SBS raid on Santorini, taking out the garrison on the island and blowing up the building housing the radio installation with time bombs. Lassen and the force, with only two casualties, successfully withdrew on two schooners.

Victoria Cross

Lassen, who was 24 years old, was serving as a temporary Major in the British Special Boat Section when he was awarded the Victoria Cross. The citation published in the London Gazette on 4 September 1945 gave the following details:

Commemoration
Lassen is buried at the Argenta Gap War Cemetery grave II, E, 11. His VC medal is on display at the Frihedsmuseet (Museum of Danish Resistance) in Copenhagen, Denmark. A bust of him was installed in the Churchill Park outside the museum in 1987.

Awards and honours

Gallery

Further reading
 
 British VCs of World War 2 (John Laffin, 1997)
 Monuments to Courage (David Harvey, 1999)
 The Register of the Victoria Cross (This England, 1997)
 Unge Anders Lassen, (Frithjof Sælen, Bergen, John Griegs Forlag, 1950)
 Harder, Thomas (2020):Anders Lassens krig, 9. april 1940-9. april 1945 (4th. revised edition, Gads Forlag, København) 
 Harder, Thomas (2021): Special Forces Hero - Anders Lassen VC, MC** (Pen and Sword Yorkshire-Philadelphia) 
 Anders Lassen – Sømand og soldat (Beretninger samlet af hans moder Suzanne Lassen, Gyldendal, København, 1949/ MeMeMedia, 2000) 
 
 If I Must Die... : From "Postmaster" to "Aquatint"'' : Gerard Fournier and Andre Heintz, OREP Editions, 2006.

References
Notes

Bibliography

External links

 Anders Lassen Fonden – The Danish Anders Lassen Foundation
 Commonwealth War Graves Register Entry for Lassen
 Article on Anders Lassen by Thomas Harder, author of "Special Forces Hero: Anders Lassen VC, MC**"
 Video talks on Anders Lassen by Thomas Harder, author of "Special Forces Hero: Anders Lassen VC, MC**"
 Articles and other material on Anders Lassen by Thomas Harder, author of "Special Forces Hero: Anders Lassen VC, MC**"
British Army Officers 1939−1945

1920 births
1945 deaths
British Army Commandos officers
British Army General List officers
British Army recipients of the Victoria Cross
British Army personnel killed in World War II
Burials at Argenta Gap War Cemetery
Danish recipients of the Victoria Cross
Danish resistance members
Danish sailors
People from Copenhagen
People from Vordingborg Municipality
Recipients of the Military Cross
Recipients of the War Cross (Greece)
Special Air Service officers
Special Boat Service officers